The 1995–96 FR Yugoslavia Cup was the fourth season of the FR Yugoslavia's annual football cup. The cup defenders was Red Star Belgrade, and they were him successfully defended, after they defeated FK Partizan in the final.

First round

|}
Note: Roman numerals in brackets denote the league tier the clubs participated in the 1995–96 season.

Second round

|}
Note: Roman numerals in brackets denote the league tier the clubs participated in the 1995–96 season.

Quarter-finals

|}
Note: Roman numerals in brackets denote the league tier the clubs participated in the 1995–96 season.

Semi-finals

|}
Note: Roman numerals in brackets denote the league tier the clubs participated in the 1995–96 season.

Final

First leg

Second leg

Red Star won 6–1 on aggregate.

See also
 1995–96 First League of FR Yugoslavia
 1995–96 Second League of FR Yugoslavia

References

External links
Results on RSSSF
Former Yugoslav Soccer

FR Yugoslavia Cup
Cup
Yugo